CIHT may refer to:

Chartered Institution of Highways and Transportation
CIHT-FM